Plowden railway station was a station in Plowden, Shropshire, England. The station was opened in February 1866 and closed on 20 April 1935.

See also
Listed buildings in Lydbury North

References

Further reading

Disused railway stations in Shropshire
Railway stations in Great Britain opened in 1866
Railway stations in Great Britain closed in 1935